Verpillières is a commune in the Somme department in Hauts-de-France in northern France.

Geography

Population

Places of interest
 The seventeenth century church of Saint Martin's. Ruined during the First World War, restoration work  began in 1926 and a new bell was christened in 1932.

See also
Communes of the Somme department

References

Communes of Somme (department)